Xaffévillers is a commune in the Vosges department in Grand Est in northeastern France.

Geography
The village lies in the middle of the commune, on the right bank of the Belvitte, a tributary of the Mortagne, which forms most of the commune's western border.

Population

See also
Communes of the Vosges department

References

Communes of Vosges (department)